Subramaniam Rajesh, popularly known as S.Rajesh, was an Indian cricketer, who has represented Kerala  in 27 first-class matches between 1981 and 1989. Rajesh, captaining two matches, was an allrounder, along with his cricketer brothers S.Ramesh and S.Santosh, played an integral role in making Kerala cricket team, a notable one of South India in 80's. Rajesh has scored over 1000 runs including 7 half centuries and has also served the state as a selector.

References

External links
 

  
1959 births
Kerala cricketers
Indian cricketers
South Zone cricketers
Cricketers from Thiruvananthapuram
2009 deaths